The list of ecoregions in Wisconsin are listings of terrestrial ecoregions (see also, ecosystem) in the United States' State of Wisconsin, as defined separately by the United States Environmental Protection Agency (USEPA), and the World Wildlife Fund.

USEPA
The USEPA ecoregion classification system has four levels, but only Levels I, III, and IV are shown on this list. Level I divides North America into 15 broad ecoregions (or biomes).  Wisconsin is within the Eastern Temperate Forest, and in the Great Plains, Level I regions.  Level IV ecoregions (denoted by numbers and letters) are a further subdivision of Level III ecoregions  (denoted by numbers alone).

Great Plains
47 Western Corn Belt Plains
47g - Prairie Pothole Region

Eastern Temperate Forest
50 Northern Lakes and Forests
50a - Lake Superior Clay Plain
50b - Minnesota/Wisconsin Upland Till Plain
50c -  St. Croix Pine Barrens
50d - Ontonagon Lobe Moraines and Gogebic Iron Range
50e - Chequamegon Moraine and Outwash Plain
50f - Blue Hills
50g - Chippewa Lobe Rocky Ground Moraines
50h - Perkinstown End Moraine
50i - Northern Highlands Lakes Country
50j - Brule and Paint River Drumlins
50k - Wisconsin/Michigan Pine and Oak Barrens
50l - Menominee Ground Moraine
51 North Central Hardwood Forests
51a - St. Croix Stagnation Moraines
51b - Central Wisconsin Undulating Till Plain
51c - Glacial Lake Wisconsin Sand Plain
51d - Central Sand Ridges
51e - Upper Wolf River Stagnation Moraine
51f - Green Bay Till and Lacustrine Plain
51g - Door Peninsula
52 Driftless Area
52a - Savanna Section
52b - Coulee Section
53 Southeastern Wisconsin Till Plains
53a - Rock River Drift Plain
53b - Kettle Moraines
53c - Southeastern Wisconsin Savannah and Till Plain
53d - Lake Michigan Lacustrine Clay Plain
54 Central Corn Belt Plains
54e - Chiwaukee Prairie Region

World Wildlife Fund

See also
Geography of Wisconsin
Climate of Wisconsin
List of ecoregions in the United States (EPA)
List of ecoregions in the United States (WWF)

References

See: Ricketts, Taylor H; Eric Dinerstein; David M. Olson; Colby J. Loucks; et al. (1999). Terrestrial Ecoregions of North America: a Conservation Assessment. Island Press; Washington, DC

Wisconsin
United States science-related lists
Wisconsin geography-related lists
Environment of Wisconsin
Wisconsin